Doc Shebeleza is the second official single from Cassper Nyovest's debut LP Tsholofelo. The song is a tribute to South African Kwaito veteran, Doc Shebeleza. It debuted at number 4 on South Africa's official music chart.

Before its release, Doc Shebeleza was teased a couple of times at live performances. It was made available for free downloads and has been downloaded over 200,000 times. The song peaked at number 1 on the 5FM Top 40 chart.

The remix for Doc Shebeleza was released on 3 November 2014. It was produced by Anatii and features a guest verse from rapper Talib Kweli.

Composition
Production was entirely handled by Fenesse formerly known as Sean Craig Beats. The African Hip Hop Blog described the song as, "A high energy track with a trap beat very similar to any of Lex Luger's last 20 offerings, including a hilarious 4 bar sequence where he acknowledges his desire to get with Minnie Dlamini".

Artwork
The artwork for the single was released on 8 January 2014 via Twitter.

DStv "Feel Every Moment" Campaign
On 21 August 2014, Cassper Nyovest announced that "Doc Shebeleza" was licensed by DStv for their "Feel Every Moment" campaign. The campaign includes an advertisement which embodies the song. The ad ran from August 2014 to February 2015.

Remix
In October 2014, Nyovest announced that he had been working with American rapper Talib Kweli on the official remix for Doc Shebeleza. It was released on 3 November 2014 as a free digital download.

Accolades

Channel O Music Video Awards

!Ref
|-
|rowspan="5"|2014
|rowspan="5"|"Doc Shebeleza"
|Most Gifted Male
|
|
|-
|Most Gifted Newcomer
|
|
|-
|Most Gifted Hip Hop
|
|
|-
|Most Gifted Southern Artist
|
|
|-
|Most Gifted Video of the Year
|
|
|-

SA Hip Hop Awards

|-
|rowspan="2"|2014
|rowspan="2"|"Doc Shebeleza"
|Song of the Year
|
|-
|Video of the Year
|
|-

Music video
The music video premiered on Channel O on 25 April 2014. It was directed by Nicky Campos and Cassper Nyovest. It features cameos from Doc Shebeleza, iFANi, Slikour, L-Tido, HHP, Smashis, Riky Rick, Maggz, Blayze, DJ Switch, Major League DJz and Fenesse (Sean Craig Beats).

Charts

Weekly charts

References

2014 singles
Hip hop songs
2013 songs
Cassper Nyovest songs